The 2015 V.League 2 (referred to as Kienlongbank V.League 2 for sponsorship reasons) was the 21st season of V.League 2, Vietnam's second tier professional football league, which began on 11 April 2015 and finished on 29 August 2015.

Changes from last season

Team changes
The following teams had changed division since the 2014 season.

To V.League 2
Promoted from Vietnamese Second Division
 Nam Định
 Phú Yên
 Bình Phước
 Công An Nhân Dân
Relegated from V.League 1
 Hùng Vương An Giang (dissolved)

From V.League 2
Relegated to Vietnamese Second Division
 Xi Măng Fico Tây Ninh
Promoted to V.League
 Đồng Tháp
 Sanna Khánh Hòa
 XSKT Cần Thơ

Teams, stadiums and locations

Result

League table

Positions by round

Result table

Top scorers

References

External links
Official Page

Second level Vietnamese football league seasons
2
Viet
Viet